Elias Neocleous & Co. LLC is the largest law firm in Cyprus. The firm has more than 140 fee-earners operating out of three offices in Cyprus and an international network of offices in the main destinations for investment via Cyprus.

The  firm Elias Neocleous & Co LLC replaced the earlier firm Andreas Neocleous & Co. That firm pioneered the development of business links with Russia and Eastern Europe two decades ago.
The firm's Limassol office houses the Honorary Consulate of Portugal in Cyprus. Elias Neocleous & Co. LLC was ranked as the leading firm in Cyprus by Legal 500. Elias Neocleous & Co LLC is among the 100 Elite Law Firms of Europe.

References

External links

Law firms established in 2017
Intellectual property law firms
Companies based in Limassol
Law firms of Cyprus